Vicente Juan Segura (born 22 May 1955) is the former bishop of Ibiza from his episcopal ordination on 14 May 2005 until 18 January 2020. Segura was formerly head of the Spanish section of the Vatican Secretariat of State.

Segura was born in Tavernes de Valldigna, in the archdiocese of Valencia. He studied law at the Faculty of Civil Law of Valencia. He began training in the ecclesiastical seminary and then in the Real Colegio Seminario y Corpus Christi. He was ordained a priest in his home parish on 24 October 1981.

After having carried out his ministry for four years in the parish of Saint Anthony Abbot, Cullera, he was called to the Pontifical Ecclesiastical Academy, and entered the Holy See's diplomatic service on 1 July 1988. He worked at the Apostolic Nunciatures to Costa Rica, Morocco and Mozambique. In 1994 he became Head of the Spanish section at the Secretariat of State. During his time in Rome he exercised ministry as assistant to the parish of St. Melchiade in Rome and at the Little Sisters of the Abandoned Elderly. On 10 June 2000 he was appointed an Honorary Prelate. He earned a Doctorate in Canon Law at the Pontifical University of Saint Thomas Aquinas, Angelicum and another doctorate in Civil Law at the University of Valencia. In addition to Spanish, he speaks French, Portuguese and Italian.

On 22 January 2005 he was appointed bishop of Ibiza by Pope John Paul II and was ordained on 14 May 2005 by Archbishop Leonardo Sandri with Cardinal Ricardo María Carles Gordó and Archbishop Agustín García-Gasco y Vicente of Valencia as principal co-consecrators.

In September 2007, Segura demanded that a collage of Pope John Paul II in a sexual pose be removed. saying that it “offended Catholic sentiment”, and calling for its “immediate and urgent withdrawal”.

References

Living people
1955 births
Diplomats of the Holy See
21st-century Roman Catholic bishops in Spain
People from Ibiza
Pontifical Ecclesiastical Academy alumni
Pontifical University of Saint Thomas Aquinas alumni